Julia Donovan Darlow, J.D. is a Michigan attorney and a Regent Emerita of the University of Michigan Board of Regents.

Education and career
Darlow earned her J.D. in 1971 from Wayne State University School of Law. She had previously earned a B. A. in history from Vassar College in 1963.

She practiced law for 36 years, first with Dickinson Wright PLLC in Detroit from 1971-2004, focusing on international and domestic business transactions and corporate governance and then with Varnum, Riddering, Schmidt & Howlett LLP in Novi, Michigan from 2005-2007, focusing on nonprofit law. She taught as adjunct professor at Wayne State University Law School in 1976 and 1996. Darlow’s many achievements have included serving as:

The first woman president of the State Bar of Michigan, 1986–1987;
Michigan Chair of the American Bar Foundation Fellows, 1991–1996;
Chair of the Michigan Supreme Court Task Force on Gender Issues in the Courts, 1987-1989; 
President of the Women Lawyers Association of Michigan, 1977-1978;
Reporter and principal drafter of the Michigan Nonprofit Corporation Act; and
Michigan State Officers Compensation Commission, 1994-1996.

Darlow has served on a number of boards of directors and boards of trustees, including the boards of the Detroit Medical Center, Hutzel Hospital, Michigan Opera Theatre, Marygrove College, Michigan Women's Foundation, the University Musical Society, Hella North America, Inc., North American Lighting, Inc., Intermet Corporation and Hueck Foils, Inc.

Darlow served as a member of the University of Michigan Board of Regents from January 1, 2007 – December 31, 2015.

Election as University of Michigan Regent
In 2006 Darlow was one of four candidates who sought one of the two Democratic nominations for the University of Michigan Board of Regents, whose members are elected by Michigan voters to eight-year terms. Incumbent Regent Kathy White; Denise Ilitch, daughter of Little Caesars owner Mike Ilitch; and Democratic activist Casandra Ulbrich. White and Darlow won the Democratic nominations for U-M Regent at the August 2006 Michigan Democratic Party Convention.

Darlow was elected to the U-M Board in the November 7, 2006, election, finishing in second place with 1,633,250 votes. Darlow was sworn in as a Regent on January 1, 2007.

External links
 Michigan Liberal: U-M Regents Challenger Julia Darlow (D-Ann Arbor)
 2006 Official Michigan General Election Results - Member of the University of Michigan Board of Regents 8 Year Terms (2) Positions
 Julia Donovan Darlow: Women in the Law 2010, Michigan Lawyers Weekly
 Elder Law celebrates two decades of service, LegalNews.com

References 

American lawyers
Living people
Year of birth missing (living people)
Regents of the University of Michigan
Wayne State University faculty
Vassar College alumni
Wayne State University alumni
American women lawyers
American women academics
21st-century American women